This article is a list of episodes of the TV series Dr. Katz, Professional Therapist. There were 81 episodes over six seasons beginning in 1995 and ending in 2002.

Series overview

Episodes

Season 1 (1995)

Season 2 (1995–96)

Season 3 (1996–97)

Season 4 (1997–98)

Season 5 (1998)

Season 6 (1999–2002)

External links

Lists of American adult animated television series episodes
Lists of American sitcom episodes
Dr. Katz, Professional Therapist